State Route 39 (SR-39) is a state highway in northern Utah connecting Ogden to Woodruff via Ogden Canyon and Huntsville. The highway is on 12th Street in Ogden and the Ogden River Scenic Byway through Ogden Canyon. The route is over sixty-seven miles long.

Prior to 1964, SR-39 was routed along 24th Street and Harrison Boulevard in Ogden. A change in the route moved the route north to 12th Street.

Route description
The route begins heading east from the intersection at 4700 West (SR-134) as a two-lane highway in a relatively rural part of Weber County. By the junction of 1900 West (SR-126) in a more urban portion of the county, the route is widened to five lanes. The highway variates in direction after Monroe Boulevard, veering to the southeast. This portion of the route (specifically west of SR-203) is included in the National Highway System.

Once exiting Ogden, the route becomes more curved as it traverses Ogden Canyon on a two-lane road, still maintaining a general east-northeasterly direction. The Ogden River runs parallel to the highway during its tenure in Ogden Canyon. This portion of the route is named Ogden River Scenic Byway. As it enters the Ogden Valley, SR-158 splits off to the north, crossing Pineview Dam, while SR-39 continues to the east, along the southern edge of Pineview Reservoir. Right before entering Huntsville, the route turns north and becomes 7800 East. The route turns east and maintains an initial north-northeasterly direction before eventually turning northeast. It traverses scenic, remote areas of the Wasatch Range and this portion between Huntsville and Woodruff is closed during winter. The route terminates on Main Street (SR-16) in Woodruff.

History
The road from Ogden to Huntsville was added to the state highway system in 1911, and in 1919 the state legislature extended it east to Randolph. The portion north from Woodruff to Randolph became part of a different highway (now SR-16) in 1921, and in 1927 the legislature defined the Ogden-Woodruff road as SR-39. The original alignment in Ogden followed 24th Street from US-91 (now US-89) east to Harrison Boulevard (SR-103, now SR-203), where it turned north and then east on Valley Drive to Ogden Canyon. State Route 205 was created in 1963, following 12th Street from SR-1 east to Harrison Boulevard, in exchange for giving SR-183A to the city. One year later, SR-39 was realigned to replace SR-205, continuing east on a new roadway from 12th Street and Harrison Boulevard to the canyon. The portion of SR-39 on Harrison Boulevard was renumbered as SR-203, which had ended at Valley Drive, and the portion on 24th Street became part of SR-37. In 1965, SR-39 was extended west to SR-84 (now SR-126), in order to form a direct connection between proposed I-15 and Ogden Canyon, and in 1969 it was extended farther to its present terminus at SR-40 (now SR-134).

Major intersections

References

External links

039
039
 039
 039
 039
Ogden, Utah